The 2007 Nigerian Senate election in Sokoto State was held on April 21, 2007, to elect members of the Nigerian Senate to represent Sokoto State. Umaru Dahiru representing Sokoto South, Ahmed Muhammad Maccido representing Sokoto North and Abubakar Umar Gada representing Sokoto East all won on the platform of the Peoples Democratic Party.

Overview

Summary

Results

Sokoto South 
The election was won by Umaru Dahiru of the Peoples Democratic Party.

Sokoto North 
The election was won by Ahmed Muhammad Maccido of the Peoples Democratic Party.

Sokoto East 
The election was won by Abubakar Umar Gada of the Peoples Democratic Party.

References 

April 2007 events in Nigeria
Sokoto State Senate elections
Sok